Subodh Roy is an Indian politician who served as Member of 13th Lok Sabha from Bhagalpur Lok Sabha constituency and Member of 14th and 15th Bihar Legislative Assembly from Sultanganj Assembly constituency. In 1998 Indian general election, he got 47.94% or 3,21,159 votes.

Personal life 
He was born in 18 July 1942 in Bhagalpur district.

References 

1942 births
Living people
Indian politicians
People from Bhagalpur district
Janata Dal (United) politicians
Communist Party of India politicians from Bihar
India MPs 1999–2004
Bihar MLAs 2010–2015
Bihar MLAs 2015–2020
Communist Party of India (Marxist) politicians from Bihar
Tilka Manjhi Bhagalpur University alumni